Teleiodes wagae, the hazel groundling, is a moth of the family Gelechiidae. It is found throughout Europe, east to Siberia.

The wingspan is 9–13 mm. Very similar to Teleiodes vulgella. Certain identification requires examination of the genitalia.

Adults are on wing from May to June.

The larvae feed on Corylus avellana, Betula, Castanea sativa and Salix caprea. They feed between two spun leaves of their host plant. Larvae can be found from August to September.

References

Moths described in 1860
Teleiodes
Moths of Europe